Richard Harris (1777 – 2 February 1854) was a British Radical politician.

Harris was elected Radical Member of Parliament (MP) for Leicester at a by-election in 1848—caused by the previous election being declared void on petition—and held the seat until 1852 when he did not seek re-election.

References

External links
 

Members of the Parliament of the United Kingdom for English constituencies
UK MPs 1847–1852
1777 births
1854 deaths